Anna Mąka (born 18 February 1948) is a Polish luger. She competed in the women's singles event at the 1968 Winter Olympics.

References

External links
 

1948 births
Living people
Polish female lugers
Olympic lugers of Poland
Lugers at the 1968 Winter Olympics
People from Myślenice County